HMS Ouse was a Laird type River-class destroyer ordered by the Royal Navy under the 1903 – 1904 Naval Estimates.

Design and construction
Ouse was one of three River-class destroyers ordered from Cammel Laird as part of the 1903–04 construction programme, with 16 River-class ships ordered in total under that programme. The destroyers ordered from Lairds under the 1903–04 programme were repeats of those built by Lairds under the 1901–02 programme and the 1902–03 programme.

Displacement was  light and  full load. Two funnels were fitted. The ship had a crew of 70 officers and other ranks. As built, Ouses armament was the same as the turtleback destroyers that preceded the Rivers, i.e. a gun armament of a single 12-pounder gun and five 6-pounder guns, and two 18-in torpedo tubes. Unlike some of the early River-class destroyers, Ouses forward two six-pounders were mounted on the forecastle along with the 12-pounder, rather than on sponsons projecting over the ship's sides, which kept them out of spray and made them easier to operate. In 1906, as a result of Japanese experience during the Russo-Japanese War, the Admiralty decided to upgrade the armament of the Rivers by replacing the five 6-pounder naval guns with three lightweight 12-pounder 8 hundredweight (cwt) guns. Two would be mounted abeam at the forecastle break and the third gun would be mounted on the quarterdeck. The class was refitted with the new armament during 1908.

Ouse was laid down on 22 March 1904 at the Cammell Laird shipyard at Birkenhead and launched on 7 January 1905.

Pre-War
After commissioning she was assigned to the East Coast Destroyer Flotilla of the 1st Fleet and based at Harwich.

On 27 April 1908 the Eastern Flotilla departed Harwich for live fire and night manoeuvres.  During these exercises HMS Attentive rammed and sank HMS Gala then damaged HMS Ribble.

In December 1910, Ouse, formerly a member of the 2nd Destroyer Flotilla, recommissioned with a nucleus crew at Chatham as a member of the 3rd Destroyer Flotilla based at the Nore. She remained until displaced by a Basilisk-class destroyer by May 1912.  She went into reserve assigned to the 5th Destroyer Flotilla of the 2nd Fleet with a nucleus crew.

On 30 August 1912 the Admiralty directed all destroyers were to be allocated to classes designated by letters starting with the letter 'A'. The ships of the River Class were assigned to the E Class.  In 1912, older destroyers were transferred to patrol flotillas, with Ouse forming part of the 9th Destroyer Flotilla, based on the Nore, and tendered to the depot ship  St George by March 1913. The 9th Flotilla was allocated the war station of the Firth of Forth.

World War I
On 30 July 1914, as part of the Royal Navy's mobilisation on the eve of the outbreak of the First World War, the 9th Flotilla , including Ouse, left Harwich for the River Tyne, with the flotilla being responsible for patrols between Berwick-upon-Tweed and midway between  Scarborough and Spurn Point. Duties of the flotilla were to prevent enemy ships from carrying out minelaying or torpedo attacks in the approaches to ports on the East coast, and to prevent raids by enemy ships.

In August 1915 with the amalgamation of the 9th and 7th Flotillas she was deployed to the 7th Destroyer Flotilla based on the River Humber.  She remained employed on the Humber Patrol participating in counter-mining operations and anti-submarine patrols for the remainder of the war.

Although one man was killed and a second was wounded, the submarine survived.

On 28 August 1918 she depth charged the German submarine UC-70, which had been spotted and damaged by a Blackburn Kangaroo patrol aircraft of No. 246 Squadron RAF near Runswick Bay off the Yorkshire coast.  UC-70 sank at position 54°32'N, 00°40'W with the loss of 31 officers and men.

On 29 September 1918, Ouse in conjunction with the destroyer  depth charged the German submarine UB-115 to destruction off Sunderland.  UB-115 sank at position 55°13'N 01°22'E with the loss of 39 officers and men.

Fate
In 1919 Ouse was paid off then laid up in reserve awaiting disposal.  On 22 October 1919 she was sold to J.H. Lee for breaking at Dover.

Pennant numbers

References

Bibliography
 
 
 
 
 
 
 
 
 
 
 
 

 

River-class destroyers
1905 ships